October is the second studio album by Irish rock band U2. It was released on 12 October 1981 by Island Records, and was produced by Steve Lillywhite. The album was lyrically inspired by the memberships of Bono, the Edge, and Larry Mullen Jr. in a Christian group called the Shalom Fellowship, and consequently it contains spiritual and religious themes. Their involvement with Shalom Fellowship led them to question the relationship between the Christian faith and the "rock and roll" lifestyle, and threatened to break up the band.

After completing the third leg of the Boy Tour in February 1981, U2 began to write new material for October, entering the recording studio in July 1981. Just as they did for their 1980 debut, Boy, the band recorded at Windmill Lane Studios with Lillywhite producing. The recording sessions were complicated by Bono's loss of a briefcase containing in-progress lyrics for the new songs, forcing a hurried, improvisational approach to completing the album on time.

October was preceded by the lead single "Fire" in July 1981, while its second single, "Gloria", coincided with its release. The album received mixed reviews and limited radio play. In 2008, a remastered edition of October was released.

Recording
In February 1981 during their Boy Tour, U2 began to write new material. ("Fire" had already been recorded at Compass Point Studios in the Bahamas while U2 took a break from the Boy Tour.) They wrote part of October during an extended sound check at First Avenue in Minneapolis. In March, on an otherwise successful American leg of the tour, the briefcase of lead vocalist Bono containing in-progress lyrics and musical ideas was lost backstage during a performance at a nightclub in Portland, Oregon. The band had limited time to write new music on tour and in July began a two-month recording session at Windmill Lane Studios largely unprepared, forcing Bono to quickly improvise lyrics. Steve Lillywhite, reprising his role as producer from U2's debut album, Boy, called the sessions "completely chaotic and mad".

Bono said of the recording process of October, "I remember the pressure it was made under, I remember writing lyrics on the microphone, and at £50 an hour, that's quite a pressure. Lillywhite was pacing up and down the studio... he coped really well. And the ironic thing about October is that there's a sort of peace about the album, even though it was recorded under that pressure. A lot of people found October hard to accept at first, I mean, I used the word 'rejoice' precisely because I knew people have a mental block against it. It's a powerful word, it's lovely to say. It's implying more than 'get up and dance, baby.' I think October goes into areas that most rock 'n' roll bands ignore. When I listen to the album, something like 'Tomorrow,' it actually moves me." The briefcase was eventually recovered in October 2004, and Bono greeted its return as "an act of grace". Whereas Lillywhite recorded Larry Mullen Jr.'s drums in the stairway of the reception area of Windmill Lane Studios for Boy, the producer moved the recording of the drums into the studio for October; Lillywhite later called it "one of the things that didn't work so well".

Composition

The record placed an emphasis on religion and spirituality, particularly in the songs "Gloria" (featuring a Latin chorus of "Gloria, in te domine"), "With a Shout (Jerusalem)", and "Tomorrow". About the album, Bono declared in 2005: "Can you imagine your second album—the difficult second album—it's about God?"

The songs mainly refine U2's formula of riff-rockers with songs such as "Gloria" and "Rejoice", but the band also expanded its musical palette in a few ways. In particular, guitarist The Edge incorporates piano in songs such as "I Fall Down", "Stranger In a Strange Land", "Scarlet", and "October". "Tomorrow", a lament to Bono's mother, who died when he was young, features Uilleann pipes played by Vinnie Kilduff later of In Tua Nua. "I Threw a Brick Through a Window" was one of the band's first songs to highlight drummer Larry Mullen, Jr., while "Gloria" highlights bassist Adam Clayton as it features three styles of playing in one song (using a pick for the most part, playing with fingers during the slide guitar by The Edge, then a "slap & pop" solo towards the end).

"Is That All?" borrows the riff from "Cry", an older song the band has used as an introduction to "The Electric Co." live.

Release
October was released on 12 October 1981. Both of the album's two singles preceded the album's release; "Fire" and "Gloria" were released as singles in July and October 1981, respectively.

October was the start of U2's vision of the music video as an integral part of the band's creative work, as it was released during a time that MTV was first becoming as popular as radio. The video for "Gloria" was directed by Meiert Avis and shot in the Canal Basin in Dublin.

In 2008, a remastered edition of the album was released, featuring remastered tracks, along with B-sides and rarities. Three different formats of the remaster were made available.

Critical reception

Upon its release, October received more mixed reviews than its predecessor. Dave McCullough of Sounds praised the album and said: "A kind of zenith pop then, no half measures. It all breathes fire, recovering too from the pair of standouts appearing at the start of each side – 'Gloria' being possibly Their Finest Moment and 'Tomorrow', low and muted, gently oozing emotion". McCullough concluded, "This October will last forever". Adam Sweeting of Melody Maker also wrote a favorable review, saying: "Their whole musical sensibility is shaped by a strong emotional bond to their homeland and its traditions. It gives them a completely different frame of reference from most groups, and on 'October' it's given them the strength to assimilate a barrage of disorientation and to turn that into a cohesive body of music."

In contrast, NME published a negative review, in which reviewer Barney Hoskyns noted the "excessive plaintiveness of Bono's voice and the forced power of U2's sound". He concluded: "Obviously rock doesn't expire just because groups run out of ways to change it... U2, I guess, will continue to 'move' in live performance, but they will only move on the lightest surface. Their music does 'soar'... But then 'God' knows, there are other religions". Jon Pareles of Rolling Stone praised the Edge for his powerful guitar playing, "drenched in echo and glory", but said Bono's vocals were negatively impacted by him taking himself too seriously and that his lyrics were silly and clichéd. Pareles acknowledged the band's attempts to vary their sound, but said "none of the strategies works as well yet as their basic power-trio dynamics". In a retrospective review, Stephen Thomas Erlewine of AllMusic said the band "tries too hard to move forward" on October, with Bono straining to make big statements and the music sounding "too pompous". Erlewine did highlight certain "thoroughly impressive" songs that "marry the message, melody, and sound together".

Track listing

2008 remastered edition
On 9 April 2008, U2.com confirmed that October, along with the other two of the band's first three albums, Boy and War would be re-released as newly remastered versions. The cover artwork for the remastered version was changed to crop the whitespace and track names. The remaster of October was released in three different formats:

Standard format: A single CD with remastered audio and restored packaging. Includes a 16-page booklet featuring previously unseen photos, full lyrics and new liner notes by Neil McCormick. The 11 tracks match the previous release of the album.
Deluxe format: A standard CD (as above) and a bonus CD. The bonus CD includes five live tracks from Hammersmith Palais, three live tracks from the BBC, the "A Celebration"/"Trash, Trampoline and the Party Girl" single released after October, the two B-sides from the album's singles, four additional live tracks from the Boston Paradise show and two other rarities. Also includes a 32-page booklet with previously unseen photos, full lyrics, new liner notes by Neil McCormick, and explanatory notes on the bonus material by The Edge.
Vinyl format: A single-album remastered version on 180-gram vinyl with restored packaging.

Bonus CD

Personnel
U2
Bono –  lead vocals
The Edge –  guitar, piano, backing vocals
Adam Clayton –  bass guitar
Larry Mullen Jr. –  drums

Additional musicians
Vinnie Kilduff –  Uileann pipes, bodhrán

Technical
Steve Lillywhite – producer
Paul Thomas – engineer
Kevin Maloney – assistant engineer
Ian Cooper – mastering

Charts

Certifications

See also 
U2 discography

References
Footnotes

Bibliography

External links
October on U2.com

U2 albums
1981 albums
Island Records albums
Albums produced by Steve Lillywhite